Tristis est anima mea (Sad is my soul) is the Latin phrase with which  starts. It is Tristis est anima mea (responsory), the second responsory of the Tenebrae for Maundy Thursday which was often set to music. It may also refer to:

Movement XI of Christus (Liszt), an oratorium by Franz Liszt
Heu me, tristis est anima mea, attributed to Philippe de Vitry
Second part of Parasceve Suite by György Deák-Bárdos
Third of Quatre motets pour un temps de pénitence by Francis Poulenc
Tristis est anima mea (attributed to Kuhnau), motet attributed to Johann Kuhnau
Tristis est anima mea (Corsi), responsory, TriC 26ad, by Giuseppe Corsi da Celano
Tristis est anima mea (de Cristo) by Pedro de Cristo
Tristis est anima mea (Gesualdo), Tenebrae Responsoria No. 2 by Carlo Gesualdo (1611)
Tristis est anima mea (Heinichen), responsory in F major, Seibel 104, by Johann David Heinichen
Tristis est anima mea (Lassus), motet by Orlande de Lassus, No. 1 in the Drexel 4302 manuscript
Tristis est anima mea (Nenna), motet (responsory) by Pomponio Nenna
Tristis est anima mea (Perosi), motet by Lorenzo Perosi
Tristis est anima mea (Robert) by Pierre Robert
No. 2 of Responsoria pro hebdomada sancta, ZWV 55, by Jan Dismas Zelenka